North Woodbury may refer to:

North Woodbury, Ohio
North Woodbury Township, Blair County, Pennsylvania